Lee Kang-in (born 19 February 2001) is a South Korean professional footballer who plays as an attacking midfielder for La Liga club Mallorca and the South Korea national team.

Lee was the Asian Football Confederation's Asian Young Footballer of the Year in 2019, the same year that he won the 2019 FIFA U-20 World Cup's Golden Ball award. Lee's team finished runner-up during the event. He also won the Copa del Rey with Valencia during that season.

Club career

Valencia B
Lee joined Valencia's academy in July 2011. On 15 December 2017, he was called up to Valencia B (Mestalla). He had his debut on 21 December 2017, in a match with Deportivo Aragón, being substituted in the 82nd minute.

He had his first assist on 17 February 2018, against Llagostera, being substituted in at the 76th minute and assisting in extra time. He had his first goal on 6 May 2018, starting against Sabadell.

Valencia

2018–19 season
He made his first team debut on 30 October 2018, starting and playing 83 minutes in a 2–1 win over Ebro in the Copa del Rey, becoming the youngest Korean footballer to debut professionally in Europe.

Lee made his La Liga debut on 12 January 2019, substituting in for Denis Cheryshev in the 86th minute in a 1–1 draw with Real Valladolid during 2018–19 season. At 17 years, 10 months, and 24 days, Lee became the second youngest player in the 18–19 La Liga after Ander Barrenetxea from Real Sociedad who debuted at the age of 16 years, 11 months, and 24 days. He also became the youngest ever non-Spanish and the first Asian league debutant for Valencia, as well as the fifth Korean to play in La Liga.

On 30 January 2019, Lee officially joined the Valencia first-team, receiving jersey number 16.

2019–20 season
On 17 September 2019, Lee made his UEFA Champions League debut as a late substitute for Rodrigo in a 1–0 win against Chelsea, becoming the youngest ever Korean to debut in the competition at the age of 18 years and 6 months, a record previously held by Jeong Woo-yeong. He also became the 5th youngest ever to debut for Los Ches in the same competition. On 25 September 2019, he scored his first La Liga goal in a 3–3 draw against Getafe, to become the youngest non-Spanish to score for Valencia, aged 18 years and 219 days old, breaking the previous record of Mohamed Sissoko who scored in the 2003–04 UEFA Cup; and the third youngest ever, only behind Juan Mena and Fernando Gómez. His record as the youngest non-Spanish goalscorer for Valencia was broken the following season by American teammate Yunus Musah.

2020–21 season
On 13 September 2020, Lee became the youngest player, aged 19 years and 207 days, to assist two goals in a La Liga match in the 21st century, in a 4–2 win over Levante, breaking the previous record of Juan Mata in 2008, aged 20 years and 150 days. Despite rejecting several renewal offers from the club throughout the year, he featured regularly under Javi Gracia  as the Che ended the campaign on a mid-table position.

After being on the transfer list during the entire pre-season, Lee terminated his contract with Valencia on 29 August 2021.

Mallorca
On 30 August 2021, fellow La Liga club Mallorca confirmed the free transfer of Lee, signing on a four-year contract. On 22 September 2021, he scored his first goal for the club in a 6–1 La Liga loss against Real Madrid.

International career

2019 U-20 World Cup 
Lee was selected to play for the South Korea U-20 football team in the 2019 FIFA U-20 World Cup and played in every group and knockout match, leading his team to a historic runner-up finish in the tournament and scoring two goals and four assists in seven games. As a result, he received the Golden Ball award as the tournament's best player.

2022 World Cup 
Lee received his first call up to the senior South Korea national football team in March 2019 for friendlies against Bolivia and Colombia, and became the 7th youngest to be in the South Korea national football team. On 5 September 2019, Lee made his international debut in a 2–2 draw friendly match against Georgia as a starter.

After a lackluster performance in a friendly loss against Japan in March 2021, Lee failed to attract national team manager Paulo Bento's attention. However, he was called up for friendlies in September 2022 just before the 2022 FIFA World Cup by showing his evolution on both side of the ball in La Liga. He only participated in team training without appearances in the friendlies, but was selected for the 26-men World Cup team. He assisted Cho Gue-sung's header with an accurate cross in the second group match against Ghana.

Media
In 2007, the six-year-old Lee was featured in the third season of the KBS N Sports reality football show Fly Shoot Dori (Korean: 날아라 슛돌이; meaning: Fly Shooting Kid). After his exceptional performance, he passed through Yoo Sang-chul's youth academy and in 2009 joined the Incheon United FC U-12 youth team. Lee later attended Seokjeong Elementary School in Incheon and played for Flyings FC. In January 2011, he went to Spain under the recommendation of his youth team coach and took part in trials for the Villarreal CF and Valencia CF youth teams.

Personal life
He was born on 19 February 2001 in Incheon, the youngest of three children. His father Lee Woon-seong was a taekwondo instructor in Incheon and a big football fan (especially of the late Diego Maradona).

Career statistics

Club

International

Honours
Valencia
Copa del Rey: 2018–19

South Korea U20
FIFA U-20 World Cup runner-up: 2019

Individual
Toulon Tournament Best XI: 2018
FIFA U-20 World Cup Golden Ball: 2019
AFC Youth Player of the Year: 2019
Korean FA Young Player of the Year: 2019

Notes

References

External links

 Profile at the RCD Mallorca website
 
 Lee Kang-in – National Team Stats at KFA 

2001 births
Living people
Sportspeople from Incheon
South Korean footballers
South Korean expatriate footballers
South Korea international footballers
Association football midfielders
Association football forwards
Footballers from the Valencian Community
Association football defenders
La Liga players
Segunda División B players
Valencia CF Mestalla footballers
Valencia CF players
RCD Mallorca players
Expatriate footballers in Spain
South Korean expatriate sportspeople in Spain
Footballers at the 2020 Summer Olympics
Olympic footballers of South Korea
South Korea under-20 international footballers
2022 FIFA World Cup players